Radko Gudas (born 5 June 1990) is a Czech professional ice hockey defenceman for the Florida Panthers in the National Hockey League (NHL). He has previously played in the NHL for the Tampa Bay Lightning, Philadelphia Flyers and the Washington Capitals.

The son of Leo Gudas, who competed for Czechoslovakia at the 1992 Winter Olympics. Gudas was raised in Kladno, and played for HC Rabat Kladno. He moved to North America in 2009, spending one season with the Everett Silvertips of the major junior Western Hockey League before the Tampa Bay Lightning selected him 66th overall in the 2010 NHL Entry Draft. Internationally Gudas played for the Czech Republic national junior team at two World Junior Championships and for the senior team at the 2014 Winter Olympics.

Playing career

Junior
Gudas played in the Czech Extraliga with HC Kladno during the 2008–09 season. Gudas was selected by the Everett Silvertips of the Western Hockey League (WHL) in the first round of the CHL Import Draft with the 20th pick. After going un-drafted in the 2009 NHL Entry Draft, Gudas was invited to the Los Angeles Kings training camp that year but was not offered a contract. He then joined the Silvertips that fall. He had a strong season with the Silvertips, posting 7 goals, 30 assists, and 151 penalty minutes. His play for the Silvertips paid off when he was selected by the Tampa Bay Lightning in the 2010 NHL Entry Draft with their 3rd-round draft pick. Gudas participated in the 2010 Lightning developmental camp that ran from 10–14 July. On 8 August 2010, the Lightning announced they had signed Gudas to a three-year entry-level contract.

Tampa Bay Lightning
Gudas participated in first NHL training camp in 2010 with the Tampa Bay Lightning. Gudas was reassigned to Tampa Bay's American Hockey League (AHL) affiliate, the Norfolk Admirals. Gudas showed a desire to lay big hits on his opposition, along with an extensive fight card in his rookie season. In total Gudas dropped the gloves 16 times, and amassed 165 penalty minutes in 76 games for the Admirals. His point totals for that season were 4 goals and 13 assists.

He spent the entire 2011–12 season in the AHL with the Admirals, and during this season Admirals set a professional hockey record by winning 28 consecutive games. Gudas helped lead the Admiral blue-line, along with fellow Lightning prospect Mark Barberio, to the 2012 Calder Cup championship in a four-game sweep of the Toronto Marlies.

Admirals and Lightning fans had been aware of Gudas' ability to grow a great beard, which he was noted for during the Admirals' playoff run. It has been a signature look of his since then.

Following the dream season for the Admirals, the Lightning ended their affiliation with Norfolk and entered into a multi-year affiliation with the Syracuse Crunch. Gudas was assigned to the  Crunch for the 2012–13 AHL season. Gudas was recalled by the Lightning on 11 March 2013. Prior to being recalled he had 4 goals and 20 points for the Crunch, at the time leading the AHL with a plus/minus rating of plus-32. He was also fourth in the league with 207 penalty minutes.

Gudas played his first NHL game against the Florida Panthers. Gudas posted three blocked shots, and two hits in 15:20 of playtime. During this game Gudas went to lay a hit on Panthers forward Kris Versteeg, who attempted to avoid the hit, but still collided with him. Versteeg wound up leaving the game with what appeared to be a right leg injury. It was revealed two days later that Versteeg would need to undergo season-ending knee surgery due to the collision. Gudas finished the remainder of the season with the Lightning, playing in 22 contests. He posted 2 goals, 3 assists, 38 penalty minutes and was a +3 in his first NHL season. Gudas rejoined the Crunch at the finish of the NHL regular season to help Syracuse Crunch in the 2013 Calder Cup playoffs. Gudas suffered a MCL injury during the Eastern Conference Championship series, and missed the first four games of the Calder Cup finals. The Crunch fell to the Grand Rapids Griffins to end Gudas' AHL career.

On Monday 6 May 2013, the Lightning announced they had signed Gudas to a 3-year contract extension.

Gudas was thrust into a top-4 role on defense for the season, with Eric Brewer being moved to a more manageable 3rd pair role. Gudas continued to play his physical game. His rough and tumble in-your-face game also landed Gudas in trouble at a few points during the season. The biggest incident involved Florida Panthers forward Scottie Upshall squirting Gudas with a bottle of water from after he had fallen in front of the Panthers bench. Gudas retaliated by smashing his stick on the Panthers in frustration. He was ejected from the game for his actions, though the Lightning went on to win the game despite being down a defenseman. Gudas also received a match penalty against the Dallas Stars on 5 March 2014, although Tampa Bay general manager Steve Yzerman announced there would not be any additional discipline from the league. Gudas finished his first full NHL season by playing three games in the Stanley Cup playoffs for the Lightning in a 4 game sweep by the Montreal Canadiens.

In the 2014–15 season, on 6 January 2015, Gudas underwent arthroscopic knee surgery. The Lightning announced that he would be out for the remainder of the regular season.

Philadelphia Flyers
On 2 March 2015, at the trade deadline Gudas was traded by the Lightning along with a first and third-round selection in the 2015 NHL Entry Draft to the Philadelphia Flyers in exchange for Braydon Coburn.

Gudas was suspended for three games on 2 December 2015, for an illegal check to the head of Mika Zibanejad during a 4–2 win against the Ottawa Senators the night before. He was not assessed a penalty for the hit during the game, though Zibanejad left the game.

Gudas signed a four-year contract with the Flyers worth $13.4 million on 23 June 2016.

In an 8 October 2016, preseason game against the Boston Bruins, Gudas delivered an interfering hit on Austin Czarnik, who left the game and soon underwent concussion protocol. While Gudas was assessed a minor penalty for boarding during the game, upon review of the incident, the NHL Department of Player Safety eventually suspended Gudas for six games, in part because of his previous suspension in 2015.

Washington Capitals
On 14 June 2019, Gudas was traded from the Flyers to the Washington Capitals in exchange for defenceman Matt Niskanen.

Florida Panthers
As a free agent from the Capitals, Gudas signed on the opening day of free agency to remain in the Eastern Conference in signing a three-year, $7.5 million contract with the Florida Panthers on 9 October 2020.

International play

On 6 January 2014, Radko Gudas was named to the Czech Republic men's national ice hockey team with teammate Ondřej Palát for the 2014 Winter Olympics in Sochi, Russia. Gudas would miss two games in the Olympics due to an apparent illness. He would appear in 3 games and record 4 penalty minutes during his first Olympics. The Czech Team were eliminated at the hands of Team USA.

Criticism
Gudas' style of play has resulted in criticism, ejections, injuries to opposing players, and subsequent reviews and suspensions from the NHL's Department of Player Safety. NBC Sports writer James O’Brien noted Gudas’ growing list of indiscretions in late 2016, writing that “If the Department of Player Safety had a speed dial list of regulars, Gudas would have a prominent spot on it.” Hockey writers have described him as reckless and as a player who consistently demonstrates no regard for opponents in vulnerable positions. As a member of the Flyers, he has been referred to by the Philadelphia sports press as a player who “represents everything that the Flyers once were and should no longer aspire to be”, as well as “a cheap-shot aficionado, reckless, careless, damaging to the Flyers' chances of winning and to other athletes' health and safety, a player who can't be trusted by either his teammates or his opponents to play a tough, clean game.” 

On 2 December 2015, the league issued Gudas a three-game suspension for a headshot delivered to Ottawa forward Mika Zibanejad a day earlier, noting that an injury was caused and that the targeting of the head was avoidable. On 10 October 2016, Gudas was issued a six-game suspension for an injury-causing hit delivered to the head of Boston Bruins’ forward Austin Czarnik in a pre-season game.

Gudas has also been involved in numerous questionable plays in which he has avoided disciplinary action despite placing opponents in danger or causing injury. This history of delivering dangerous hits while typically avoiding suspension has been referred to facetiously as Gudas’ “signature skill” as a professional hockey player. In mid-February 2016, Gudas was ejected from a game for the third time in sixteen days after he injured New Jersey Devils’ forward Bobby Farnham with a late hit which targeted the head of a player not involved in the play. Gudas was ejected for boarding New York Rangers' forward Jimmy Vesey in a  pre-season game on 3 October 2016, receiving a five-minute major penalty and a game misconduct.  On 26 October 2017, Gudas was again ejected, receiving a five-minute major and a game misconduct after targeting the head of Ottawa Senators’ defenseman Chris Wideman.

Flyers’ coach Dave Hakstol and GM Ron Hextall were reported to have met with Gudas in early 2016 to discuss his on-ice actions. The Philadelphia sports press noted that Gudas' behavior only worsened after the meeting, lamenting that Gudas’ on-ice actions were likely to encourage retaliation not against himself, but against the Flyers' star players such as Claude Giroux and Jakub Voráček.

On 20 November 2017, Gudas was suspended for ten games without pay for a slash to the neck of Winnipeg Jets' forward Mathieu Perreault while Perreault was in a prone position on the ice. Upon returning from this ten game suspension, Gudas immediately found himself in the news again after leaving his feet to deliver a hit to New Jersey Devils' forward Kyle Palmieri on February 1, 2018. Though he avoided another suspension and claimed the incident was accidental, Palmieri said he believed Gudas no longer deserved the benefit of the doubt in light of his history, adding that he felt the Flyers' player had "run out of second chances."

Personal life
Gudas and his girlfriend have a daughter together. Gudas' sister, actress and singer Karolina Gudasová, is married to former teammate Michal Neuvirth.

Career statistics

Regular season and playoffs

International

References

External links

 

1990 births
Living people
Czech expatriate ice hockey people
Czech expatriate ice hockey players in the United States
Czech ice hockey defencemen
Everett Silvertips players
Florida Panthers players
Rytíři Kladno players
Ice hockey players at the 2014 Winter Olympics
Norfolk Admirals players
Olympic ice hockey players of the Czech Republic
Sportspeople from Kladno
Philadelphia Flyers players
Syracuse Crunch players
Tampa Bay Lightning draft picks
Tampa Bay Lightning players
Washington Capitals players
HC Berounští Medvědi players